Karl August Friedrich Neuhaus, known as Fritz (3 April 1852, Elberfeld - 5 September 1922, Düsseldorf) was a German genre and history painter; associated with the Düsseldorfer Malerschule.

Life and work 
He grew up in modest circumstances. After serving an apprenticeship with a lithographer in Barmen, he enrolled at the Kunstakademie Düsseldorf in 1873. There he studied with Eduard von Gebhardt and Wilhelm Sohn. His debut came in 1878, at an exhibition in Berlin. He graduated in 1880 and married Bertha Zilcher.

After 1884, he taught painting and figure drawing at the Kunstgewerbeschule Düsseldorf (School of Arts and Crafts), where he also maintained a studio. By the latter part of the 1880s, he had become successful enough to afford an apartment and studio in an upper-class part of the city. In 1892, he participated in a competition to provide decorative paintings for the new . His entry was given third place. It depicted a performance and banquet, honoring Emperor Wilhelm I, that was held in the event hall of the artists' association "Malkasten" (Paintbox) in 1877. Two years after the competition he was able to paint it, in the form of a mural, in one of the Town Hall's meeting rooms. It was destroyed during World War II.

In 1898, he was awarded the title of Professor. Around that same time his son, Carl (1881–1929), established his own sculpture studio.

References

Further reading 
 Hermann Alexander Müller: Biographisches Künstler-Lexikon. Verlag des Biographischen Instituts, Leipzig 1882, pg.390 (Online).
 Friedrich Schaarschmidt: Zur Geschichte der Düsseldorfer Kunst, insbesondere im XIX. Jahrhundert. Kunstverein für die Rheinlande und Westfalen, Düsseldorf 1902, pg.278 (Online)
 "Neuhaus, Fritz", in: Allgemeines Lexikon der Bildenden Künstler von der Antike bis zur Gegenwart, Vol. 25: Moehring–Olivié, E. A. Seemann, Leipzig, 1931 pp. 408–409

External links 

 Kunst-Auktionshaus, G. Adolf Pohl (Ed.): Künstlerischer Nachlaß Professor Fritz Neuhaus † Düsseldorf, Auction catalog, Hamburg, 1922, pg.9 (Online).

1852 births
1922 deaths
19th-century German painters
19th-century German male artists
German genre painters
German history painters
Kunstakademie Düsseldorf alumni
People from Elberfeld
20th-century German painters
20th-century German male artists